Esteban Evan Bacero Contreras II is a Filipino politician from the province of Capiz in the Philippines. He served as Governor of Capiz from 2019 until his re-election loss in 2022. He was the Vice Governor of the province from 2010 to 2019 and he was first elected as Governor of the province in 2019.

References

External links
Province of Capiz Official Website

|-

Living people
People from Capiz
Independent politicians in the Philippines
Governors of Capiz
1969 births